The Riven Kingdom is the second novel in the Godspeaker series by Karen Miller.

Plot summary
For hundreds of years, the small island kingdom of Ethrea sat in the middle of a precariously balanced treaty agreement that ensured peace. With the king on his deathbed, and no male heirs, Princess Rhian must find a way to keep the kingdom out of the hands of the evil Prolate Marlan, and prevent a war.

2007 Australian novels
Novels by Karen Miller
Australian fantasy novels
Novels set on islands
HarperCollins books